Phalina is a village in Darkali Mamuri Union council of Kallar Syedan Tehsil, Rawalpindi District in the Punjab Province of Pakistan.

Schools in Phalina 
A government school for boys is also located here.

Places of interest 
Phalina Noor Dam is place worth seeing here.

References 

Populated places in Kallar Syedan Tehsil
Villages in Kallar Syedan Tehsil